Edward Osei-Kwaku was a Ghanaian lawyer and politician. He served as the deputy Minister for Presidential Affairs, and Minister of Youth and Sports during the Kufuor administration. He also served as a member of parliament for the Asokwa West constituency from 7 January 1997 to 6 January 2005.

Education 
Osei-Kwaku was educated at Adisadel College (Cape Coast) and from there obtained his Bachelor of Laws degree from the University of Ghana.

Career 
Prior to entering politics, Osei-Kwaku worked as a lawyer with Afriyie Chambers.

Politics 
Osei-Kwaku was a member of the New Patriotic Party, he served as the member of parliament for the Asokwa West constituency from 7 January 1997 to 6 January 2005. During the 1996 Ghanaian general election, he polled 42,734 votes which accounted for 52.7% of the total votes cast, and during the 2000 Ghanaian general election, he polled 48,738 votes which accounted for 74.5% of the total votes cast. During the Kufuor administration, he was appointed deputy Minister for Presidential Affairs and later Minister of Youth and Sports. During his tenure of office as the Minister of Youth and Sports, he helped initiate the bid for Ghana to host the CAN 2008 tournament. He also aided in the rehabilitation of Ghana's then major stadia, the Accra Sports Stadium and the Kumasi Sports Stadium (now Baba Yara Stadium).

Personal life 
Osei-Kwaku was a Christian and a member of the St Cyprian Anglican Church of Ghana. He died on Tuesday 13 September 2005.

References 

20th-century Ghanaian lawyers
Ghanaian MPs 1997–2001
Ghanaian MPs 2001–2005
Ghanaian Christians
University of Ghana alumni
New Patriotic Party politicians
2005 deaths
People from Ashanti Region